The Ngintait, or Ngindadj, are an Australian Aboriginal Peoples of the northwest corner of the state of Victoria, and partly in South Australia. 9 people, all of one family, claim descent from the tribe, which was dispersed in the 19th century.

Language
The Ngintait language belonged to the Lower Murray languages and is often classified as a dialect of Yuyu

Country
It covered the area above Paringa in south Australia, to near Mildura in Victoria. Its southern boundaries reached down some 50 miles from the Murray. Their tribal lands encompassed Ned's Corner and also the Salt Creek area of New South Wales. Jaraldekalt informants of the anthropologist Ronald Berndt and his wife Catherine that the area defined by Norman Tindale as Ngintait territory was actually dwelt in by the Erawirung, and located the Ngintait further away from the Murray.

History
According to Darren Perry, the former chair of the Murray Lower Darling Rivers Indigenous Nations, and the only person tracing his and his family of nine's origins to the Ngintait, the original Ngintait clans were dispersed during the guerilla wars of the early 1840s about the Rufus River.

Native title
The Ngintait, as represented by Perry, have made a claim for native title claiming they have custodian obligations to the rich native burial grounds in their area.

Alternative names
 Inteck
 Merri (This referred their language).
 Nutcha
 Takadok

Some words
 Broolach (kangaroo).
 nutchaa. (mother)
 ruchaa. (father)
 thougha. (whiteman)
 wilking. (tame dog)

Notes

Citations

Sources

Aboriginal peoples of South Australia